"Laughing Song" is a poem published in 1789 by the English poet William Blake. This poem is one of nineteen in Blake's collection Songs of Innocence.

Analysis of the poem 
"Laughing Song" is a lyric poem, written in three stanzas of four-beat lines rhyming aabb. The title of this poem and its rhyme scheme is very appropriate for the message that Blake is trying to convey. The title in itself states that this is a song about laughter, and the three stanzas give this impression, especially in the final line of the second stanza: "With their sweet round mouths sing 'Ha, Ha, He.' ", and the final line of the third stanza: "To sing the sweet chorus of 'Ha, Ha, He.' "

Using words like "sing" and "chorus" for emphasis, Blake sets out to lure readers to the happiness of prelapsarian times, when things were unspoiled and innocent. Blake is inviting the readers to take part in the celebration; after all nature and all the people have begun to laugh and be merry, he wants all to come join in the song. In the idea of prelapsarian/postlapsarian times, he knows that this great joy will not last forever. The poem begins with the laughter and happiness of nature in the first stanza, personifying the wood, hills, and air. In the second stanza, Blake gradually goes on to the "grasshopper" and "Mary and Susan and Emily," the children who will also join in the singing of the "Ha, Ha, He." The children and grasshopper also reiterate the idea of innocence and joy.  Repetition of the words "merry" and "laughs/laughing" also emphasises the overall tone of the poem.

Illustration
The illustration shows what Blake was trying to express. It shows an outdoor gathering or celebration in which all are one with nature, and laugh with the trees as expressed in the poem. The colours in the image are vibrant, and the border of birds adds a joyous touch.

Notes

References
Blake, William. "Songs of Innocence and of Experience, Copy B, 1789, 1794 (British Museum): Electronic Edition." Songs of Innocence and of Experience, Copy B, 1789, 1794 (British Museum): Electronic Edition. Morris Eaves, Robert N. Essick, and Joseph Viscomi, n.d. Web. 05 Dec. 2013.
"William Blake." : The Poetry Foundation. N.p., n.d. Web. 04 Dec. 2013.
"Summary and Analysis of Laughing Song by William Blake." Beaming Notes. N.p., n.d. Web. 05 Dec. 2013.

External links

A comparison of extant versions of Blake's hand painted copies of "Laughing Song" at the William Blake Archive

Songs of Innocence and of Experience
1789 poems